Glen John Provost (born August 9, 1949) is an American prelate of the Roman Catholic Church who has served as the bishop of the Diocese of Lake Charles in Louisiana since 2007.

Biography

Early life 
Glen Provost was born on  August 9, 1949, to Cyrus and Sadie Marie Blanchet Provost in Lafayette, Louisiana. He received a Bachelor of Arts in English Literature from Saint Joseph Seminary College in Covington, Louisiana, in 1971.  Provost continued his studies in Rome while living at the Pontifical North American College. In 1974, he was awarded the a Bachelor of Sacred Theology degree from St. Thomas University in Rome and a Licentiate in Sacred Theology in 1975. In 1981, Provost earned a Master of Arts in English Literature from the University of Louisiana-Lafayette in Lafayette, Louisiana.

Provost's later studies include work at Institut Catholique in Paris (1972: French language); the University of London (1980: Victorian language); the Don Quixote Institute in Salamanca, Spain (1997: Spanish); the Istituto Santa Maria in Rome (1971: Italian); and archaeological study tours to Syria, Jordan and Turkey.

Provost was ordained to the priesthood for the Diocese of Lafayette by Pope Paul VI on June 29, 1975 in St. Peter’s Basilica in Vatican City.

Bishop of Lake Charles
Provost was appointed bishop of the Diocese of Lake Charles by Pope Benedict XVI on March 6, 2007.  He was consecrated,on April 23, 2007, with Archbishop Alfred C. Hughes as principal celebrant. His installation brought to a close the two-year 'sede vacante' the diocese experienced after his predecessor, Bishop Edward Braxton, was appointed Bishop of Belleville, Illinois, on March 15, 2005.

In addition to English, Provost speaks French, Italian, and Spanish.

See also

 Catholic Church hierarchy
 Catholic Church in the United States
 Historical list of the Catholic bishops of the United States
 List of Catholic bishops of the United States
 Lists of patriarchs, archbishops, and bishops

References

External links

Roman Catholic Diocese of Lake Charles Official Site

Episcopal succession

1949 births
Living people
People from Lafayette, Louisiana
Saint Joseph Seminary College alumni
University of Louisiana at Lafayette alumni
Institut Catholique de Paris alumni
Alumni of the University of London
21st-century Roman Catholic bishops in India